Harry S Truman State Park is a public recreation area occupying  on a peninsula on Truman Lake, a  impoundment of the Osage River, near Warsaw, Missouri. The state park offers boating, fishing, swimming, hiking trails, and campgrounds.

References

External links
Harry S Truman State Park Missouri Department of Natural Resources 
Harry S Truman State Park Map Missouri Department of Natural Resources

State parks of Missouri
Protected areas of Benton County, Missouri
1976 establishments in Missouri
Protected areas established in 1976